Kamianske, formerly Dniprodzerzhynsk, is an industrial city in Dnipropetrovsk Oblast of Ukraine and a port on the Dnieper. Administratively, it serves as the administrative center of Kamianske Raion. Kamianske hosts the administration of Kamianske urban hromada, one of the hromadas of Ukraine. Population: 

The city was known as Dniprodzerzhynsk from 1936 to 2016. On 19 May 2016, it was renamed back to its historical name of Kamianske. Along with the city's name change, the city's hydroelectric station was renamed to Middle Dnieper Hydroelectric Power Plant.

Besides the hydroelectric station, the city houses a few other industrial enterprises: Prydniprovsky Chemical Plant (closed in 1991), Bahley Coke Factory and Dnieper Metallurgical Combine.

History

The first written evidence of settlement in the territory of Kamianske appeared in 1750. At that time the villages of Romankove and Kamianske, which make up the modern city, formed a part of the Nova (New) Sich of the  Zaporizhian cossacks. The city was known as Kamianske, lit. Stony Place (Kamenskoye) until 1936 when it was renamed to Dniprodzerzhynsk – the name honored the Dnieper River and the communist Felix Dzerzhynsky (1877-1926), the founder of the Bolshevik secret police, the Cheka. 

Soviet vozhd Leonid Brezhnev was born and raised in Kamianske.

On 15 May 2015 the President of Ukraine, Petro Poroshenko, signed a bill into law that started a six-month period for the removal of communist monuments and the mandatory renaming of settlements with names related to communism. The following year, on 19 May 2016, the Ukrainian Verkhovna Rada voted to rename Dniprodzerzhynsk, which reverted to using its historic name Kamianske.

Until 18 July 2020, Kamianske was incorporated as a city of oblast significance and the center of Kamianske Municipality. The municipality was abolished in July 2020 as part of the administrative reform of Ukraine, which reduced the number of raions of Dnipropetrovsk Oblast to seven. The area of Kamianske Municipality was merged into newly established Kamianske Raion.

Geography
While mostly located on right bank of Dnieper, Kamianske stretches over the hydroelectric station onto the left bank where the portion of city is known as "Livyi bereh" neighborhood (literally Left bank). The neighborhood arches to the west of the Kamianske's suburb of Kurylivka.

To the east Kamianske municipality borders Dnipro city creating an urban sprawl.

Climate 
The climate is moderately continental, dry. The amount of precipitation per year is about 400 mm. The average daily temperature is -6° C in January, + 21° C in July.

Administrative divisions 

 Dniprovskyi district (western city district)
neighborhoods: Romankove (former settlement), Livyi bereh
 Zavodskyi district (central city district)
neighborhoods: City center, Dnieper Metallurgical Combine
 Pivdennyi district (south and eastern city parts)
settlements: Karnaukhivka, Svitle
neighborhoods: Sotsmisto, Pivdennyi, Bahliy Coke Factory, DniproAzot and Prydniprovskyi Chemical Factory

Economy
The economic base of Kamianske is almost exclusively centered on heavy industry, with ferrous metallurgy being the  backbone of the local economy. Around 57% of the total industrial production is metallurgy and metal working. The chemical industry comes second with ca. 17% share of the total industrial output. While the exceedingly industrialized nature of the local economy ensures a rather high employment rate (as of 01.11.2007, official unemployment stood at 1.40%), it also contributes to excessive pollution and radiation levels in the city.

 Prydniprovsky Chemical Plant (closed down)
 Bahley Coke Factory
 Dnieper Metallurgical Combine
 DniproAzot
 Dniprodzerzhynsk Cement Factory
 Dniprodzerzhynsk Electrical Central
 Middle Dnieper Hydroelectric Plant

Culture

Several Eastern Orthodox churches, the largest being the Orthodox Cathedral of Saint Nicholas, which dates from 1894, serve the faithful of the city. By 2018, there were 22 parishes of Ukrainian Orthodox Church in Kamianske.

The Roman Catholic Church of Saint Nicholas built by the city's Polish community at the end of the nineteenth century, has become one of the centers of Roman Catholicism in Eastern Ukraine. The Catholic Parish of Saint Nicholas also includes a monastery run by the Order of Friars Minor Capuchin.

The town has an active Jewish community with a new synagogue and community center.

Ecology 
Kamianske is a city with a very difficult environmental conditions. The city is on the top 10 of the most air-polluted cities of Ukraine. There have been suggestions to assign the status of the ecological disaster city. Right-bank part of the city is mostly polluted, where the metallurgical, chemical industrial enterprises are located.

In 2008, an interdepartmental commission for solving environmental problems  was created.

International relations

Twin towns — Sister cities
Kamianske is twinned with:

  Kielce, Poland
  Babruysk, Belarus
  Temirtau, Kazakhstan

Gallery

See also
Kamianske River Port

References

External links
 The murder of the Jews of Dniprodzerzhynsk during World War II, at Yad Vashem website.

 
Cities in Dnipropetrovsk Oblast
Cities of regional significance in Ukraine
Populated places established in the Russian Empire
Yekaterinoslav Governorate
City name changes in Ukraine
Former Soviet toponymy in Ukraine
Holocaust locations in Ukraine
Populated places on the Dnieper in Ukraine